West Budleigh Hundred was the name of one of thirty two ancient administrative units of Devon, England.

The parishes in the hundred were:
Cheriton Fitzpaine,
Poughill,
Shobrooke,
Stockleigh English,
Stockleigh Pomeroy,
Upton Hellions and
Washfield

See also 
 List of hundreds of England and Wales - Devon

Gallery

References 

Hundreds of Devon